Adam Inglis (born 14 July 1929) is a former Australian rules footballer who played with the Carlton Football Club in the Victorian Football League (VFL).

Notes

External links 

Adam Inglis's profile at Blueseum

1929 births
Possibly living people
Carlton Football Club players
Australian rules footballers from Victoria (Australia)